Wanted Man is an upcoming action film starring and directed by Dolph Lundgren, who also wrote the screenplay with Michael Worth.

Cast
Dolph Lundgren as Travis Johansen
Kelsey Grammer
Christina Villa
 Cesar Miramontes as El Coyote

Production

Filming
Filming began in Las Cruces, New Mexico in May 2022.

References

External links
 

Upcoming films
American action films
Films shot in New Mexico
Films directed by Dolph Lundgren
Films with screenplays by Dolph Lundgren